Kidaru is an administrative ward in the Kongwa district of the Singida Region of Tanzania. According to the 2002 census, the ward has a total population of 10,469.

References

Wards of Singida Region